Jonathan Peled was the Ambassador of Israel to Mexico since July 2015-2019 (concurrent with Belize and the Bahamas), and is former Ambassador of Israel to El Salvador (2004 - 2006), former Foreign Ministry Spokesman and former Spokesman for the Israeli Embassy in Washington D.C.
Jonathan is also the former ambassador of Australia.

Early life
Peled was born in Jerusalem and grew up at Kibbutz Neot Mordechai.  He studied Political Science and Economics at Tel Aviv University.

Peled has one sibling and three children.

Mexico
Shortly after Donald Trump’s 2017 inauguration, it was reported that Peled would be called in for a meeting with Mexican Foreign Minister Luis Videgaray Caso where he was “expected to receive an angry telling off after Netanyahu tweeted that Trump’s border wall was a ‘great idea,’ comparing it to the wall on Israel’s southern border.”

References

Ambassadors of Israel to Belize
Ambassadors of Israel to El Salvador
Ambassadors of Israel to Mexico
Ambassadors of Israel to the Bahamas
Tel Aviv University alumni
Year of birth missing (living people)
Living people